Dave Smith is a Canadian politician, who was elected to the Legislative Assembly of Ontario in the 2018 provincial election. He represents the riding of Peterborough—Kawartha as a member of the Progressive Conservative Party of Ontario.

Background
Smith was born in Belleville and raised in Wellington, Bowmanville and Picton. He attended Bowmanville High School and Prince Edward Collegiate Institute has a Bachelor of Science degree in Computing Systems from Trent University and a Master of Business Administration from the University of Fredericton (2018). Prior to entering politics, Smith worked as the Manager of Product Development for Cardinal Software and was the lead developer of the company's products for Co-operative education, Ontario Youth Apprenticeship and Specialist High Skill Major.  He was the project manager for the development of Cardinal Software's Individual Education Plan software.  Prior to moving to the Cardinal Software in 2006, Smith worked in the ICT Department of Kawartha Pine Ridge District School Board.

Electoral record

Politics
On October 22, 2018 Smith introduced a Private Members Bill named The Terrorist Sanctions Act (Bill 46).  The Bill amends a number of Acts to provide for sanctions for any person convicted of a terrorist offence under any of sections 83.18 to 83.221 of the Criminal Code (Canada).  The child of a parent who is convicted of a terrorist offence is considered in need of protection under Part V of the Child, Youth and Family Services Act, 2017.  As well, a person who is convicted of a terrorist offence is not eligible for any of the following:

A Licence under the Fish and Wildlife Conservation Act, 1997.
Health insurance benefits under the Health Insurance Act.
 A driver's licence under the Highway Traffic Act.
 Rent-geared-to-income assistance or special needs housing under the Housing Services Act, 2011.
Grants, awards or loans under the Ministry of Training, Colleges and Universities Act.
 Income support or employment supports under the Ontario Disability Support Program Act, 1997.
Assistance under the Ontario Works Act, 1997.
 Coverage under the insurance plan under the Workplace Safety and Insurance Act, 1997.

The bill passed second reading on November 15, 2018

Smith also introduced a second Private Members Bill (Bill 53) entitled Special Hockey Day Act 2018.  The Bill proclaims March 27, 2019 as Special Hockey Day to coincide with the start of the 25th annual Special Hockey International tournament in Toronto.  After first reading of this Bill it was reintroduced as schedule 39 in the Fall Economic Statement and received Royal Assent on December 6, 2018.

References

1970 births
Businesspeople from Ontario
Businesspeople in software
Living people
Politicians from Belleville, Ontario
People from Peterborough, Ontario
Progressive Conservative Party of Ontario MPPs
Trent University alumni
University of Fredericton alumni
21st-century Canadian politicians